Places called Wansbeck include:
The River Wansbeck, a river in Northumberland, England
Wansbeck District—a former local government district in south-east Northumberland, through which the river flows
Wansbeck (UK Parliament constituency)—a constituency in the same area, represented in the UK House of Commons
Alternative spelling of Wandsbek—a borough of Hamburg, Germany